Mount Klabat is the highest volcano on Sulawesi island, located in the east of Manado city, North Sulawesi, Indonesia. A 170 × 250 m wide, shallow crater lake is found at the summit. There are no confirmed historical eruptions of the volcano. A report of eruption taking place in 1683 is thought to have been produced by the Mount Tongkoko volcano instead .

See also 

 List of volcanoes in Indonesia
 List of Ultras of Malay Archipelago

References 

Klabat
Klabat
Klabat
Klabat
Landforms of North Sulawesi
Holocene stratovolcanoes